Telescopic is the second album by Edith Frost. It was released in 1998 through Drag City.

Critical reception
No Depression wrote that "with a pure snowfall of distortion, bending, swirling chords, and a cool, clear voice that rises into the stratosphere like a singular, heavenly choir, Edith Frost’s second album, Telescopic, walks the line between tradition and innovation." The Chicago Tribune wrote: "A mix of clean C&W hickory and piquant avant-rock fuzz, Telescopic is an engaging, if less immediate, record that suffers only from its static mood and pacing."

Track listing

Personnel 
Musicians
Jean Cook – violin
Amy Domingues – cello
Edith Frost – vocals, guitar
Ryan Hembrey – bass guitar
Rian Murphy – drums
Jason Quick – flute, photography
Production and additional personnel
John Golden – mastering
Neil Hagerty – production
Jennifer Herrema – production
Christian Quick – engineering

References

External links 
 

1998 albums
Drag City (record label) albums
Edith Frost albums